William Finley Semple (1832-1923) was a dentist from Mount Vernon, Ohio, commonly referred to as the first person anywhere to patent a chewing gum. On December 28, 1869, Semple filed Patent No. 98,304 with the U.S. Commissioner of Patents. However, Amos Tyler of Toledo, Ohio, patented his chewing gum on July 27 of the same year. John B. Curtis successfully sold his "State of Maine Pure Spruce Gum" in 1848, though he did not patent it.

Semple's gum was intended to clean the teeth and strengthen the chewer's jaw. It was not a sweet treat; ingredients included chalk and powdered licorice root. Charcoal was also suggested as a "suitable" ingredient in the patent.

Patent No. 98,304

References

American dentists
1832 births
1923 deaths